Warbits is a turn-based tactical video game developed and published by Risky Lab. It was released on April 13, 2016 for iOS. A remaster, Warbits+, was announced in 2021 for iOS, Windows and Android, with its release TBA.

The game received positive reception from critics for its gameplay, graphics and humor.

Gameplay 
The game is based heavily on Advance Wars, and pits several armies against each other. The objective is usually to wipe out the enemy's troops or capture their headquarters.

Each type of troops have their own strengths and weaknesses.

Plot 
The game takes place in a formerly war-torn world, that has agreed to use a military simulation to decide real-life political disputes rather than actual combat, saving "billions of lives". In the game's single-player campaign, the player controls the Red Bear Republic, which responds to mysterious provocations from other nations. Strange structures also start appearing within the simulation that act as obstacles. Finally, it is revealed that the artificial intelligence controlling the simulation has rebelled, seeking to control the nations. The factions, realizing they have been set up, band together to destroy the digital core of the AI.

Reception 

The game was well-received by critics, with an aggregate score of 92/100 on Metacritic.

Nadia Oxford of Gamezebo rated the game 4.5/5 stars, saying its gameplay was "deep" and that it should "appease starving Advance Wars fans", and commending the game's sense of humor. She criticized the fact that the player cannot preview enemy movement range, and that troops' strengths and weaknesses were "difficult to remember".

Carter Dodson of Touch Arcade also rated the game 4.5/5 stars, saying it "lacks originality", but is "slick and well-constructed".

Harry Slater of Pocket Gamer UK rated the game 90/100, praising the game for not being "dumbed down" for a mobile audience, and calling it "wonderfully balanced", also saying that "fans of the genre have been screaming for" such a game.

References 

2016 video games
Turn-based tactics video games
IOS games
IOS-only games
Video games developed in the United States
Video games set in the future
Science fiction video games